The 2021 Open de Oeiras was a professional tennis tournament played on clay courts. It was the first edition of the tournament which was part of the 2021 ATP Challenger Tour. It took place in Oeiras, Portugal between 29 March and 3 April 2021.

Singles main-draw entrants

Seeds

 1 Rankings are as of 22 March 2021.

Other entrants
The following players received wildcards into the singles main draw:
  Nuno Borges
  Tiago Cação
  Gastão Elias

The following player received entry into the singles main draw as an alternate:
  Harry Bourchier

The following players received entry from the qualifying draw:
  Raúl Brancaccio
  Evan Furness
  Manuel Guinard
  Denis Yevseyev

The following players received entry as lucky losers:
  Francisco Cabral
  Luís Faria

Champions

Singles

 Zdeněk Kolář def.  Gastão Elias 6–4, 7–5.

Doubles

 Mats Moraing /  Oscar Otte def.  Riccardo Bonadio /  Denis Yevseyev 6–1, 6–4.

References

2021 ATP Challenger Tour
2021 in Portuguese tennis
March 2021 sports events in Portugal
April 2021 sports events in Portugal